The Seal of Muhammad (Turkish: Muhammed'in mührü) is one of the relics of Muhammad kept in the Topkapı Palace by the Ottoman Sultans as part of the Sacred Relics collection.

The most popular design is allegedly the replica of a seal used by Muhammad on several letters sent to foreign dignitaries.

Topkapı seal 
Jean-Baptiste Tavernier in 1675 reported that the seal was kept in a small ebony box in a niche cut in the wall by the foot of a divan in the relic room at Topkapı. The seal itself is encased in crystal, approximately 3" × 4", with a border of ivory. It has been used as recently as the 17th century to stamp documents.

According to Muslim historiographical tradition, Muhammad's original seal was inherited by  Abu Bakr, Umar, and Uthman, but lost by Uthman in a well in Medina. Uthman is said to have made a replica of the seal, and this seal was supposedly found in the capture of Baghdad (1534) and brought to Istanbul.

According to George Frederick Kunz, when Muhammad was about to send a letter to the Emperor Heraclius, he was told he needed a seal to be recognized as coming from him. Muhammad had a seal made of silver, with the words Muḥammad rasūl Allāh or "Muhammad the Apostle of God." The three words, on three lines, were on the ring, and Muhammad ordered that no duplicate was to be made. After his death, the ring came down to Uthman, who accidentally dropped the ring into the well of Aris. The well was so deep the bottom has never been found, and the ring remained lost. At that time a copy was made, but the loss of the original ring was assumed to be an indication of ill-fortune to come.

Sir Richard Francis Burton writes that it is a "Tradition of the Prophet" that carnelian is the best stone for a signet ring, and that tradition was still in use in 1868. The carnelian stone is also "a guard against poverty".

Muqwaki seal 

A different design of the seal of Muhammad is circular, based on Ottoman era manuscript copies of the letters of Muhammad. This is the variant that has become familiar as the "seal of Muhammad."

The authenticity of the letters and of the seal is dubious and has been contested almost as soon as their discovery, although there is little research on the subject. Some scholars such as Nöldeke (1909) consider the currently preserved copy to be a forgery, and Öhrnberg (2007) considers the whole narrative concerning the letter to the Muqawqis to be "devoid of any historical value", and the seal to be fake on paleographical grounds, the writing style being anachronical and hinting at an Ottoman Turkish origin.

Other signatures 

In addition to using a signet ring to seal documents, Muhammad may have also used other techniques to show the provenance of his correspondence. In an alleged letter to the Saint Catherine's Monastery in Egypt, he signed the letter, also called the Ashtiname of Muhammad, by inking his hand and pressing the impression on the paper. The letter granted protection and privileges to the monastery. In part it says: "I shall exempt them from that which may disturb them; of the burdens which are paid by others as an oath of allegiance. They must not give anything of their income but that which pleases them—they must not be offended, or disturbed, or coerced or compelled. Their judges should not be changed or prevented from accomplishing their offices, nor the monks disturbed in exercising their religious order, or the people of seclusion be stopped from dwelling in their cells. No one is allowed to plunder these Christians, or destroy or spoil any of their churches, or houses of worship, or take any of the things contained within these houses and bring it to the houses of Islam. And he who takes away anything therefrom, will be one who has corrupted the oath of God, and, in truth, disobeyed His Messenger." It is sealed with an imprint representing Muhammad's hand.

Notes

References

Possessions of Muhammad
Relics
Seals (insignia)
Islamic religious objects